The following lists events that happened during the year 1994 in Bosnia and Herzegovina.

Incumbents
President: Alija Izetbegović
Prime Minister: Haris Silajdžić 

 
Years of the 20th century in Bosnia and Herzegovina
1990s in Bosnia and Herzegovina
Bosnia and Herzegovina
Bosnia and Herzegovina